Danube Waltz is a 1930 German silent film directed by Victor Janson and starring Harry Liedtke, Harry Hardt, and Adele Sandrock. It was part of a group of nostalgic screenplays by Walter Reisch set in his native Austria.

Cast

References

Bibliography

External links

1930 films
Films of the Weimar Republic
German silent feature films
Films directed by Victor Janson
Films set in Austria
German black-and-white films
1930s German-language films
1930s German films